Giuseppe Libani (1845-1880) was an Italian composer. Born in Rome, he is chiefly remembered for his three operas: Gulnara (1869, Palazzo Pamphilj) Il Conte Verde (1873, Teatro Apollo), and Sardanapalo (1880, Teatro Apollo). He died at the age of 35 in Rome.

References

1845 births
1880 deaths
Italian classical composers
Italian male classical composers
Italian opera composers
Male opera composers
Musicians from Rome
19th-century classical composers
19th-century Italian composers
19th-century Italian male musicians